Cervecería Centro Americana Sociedad Anónima is a Guatemalan brewery based in Guatemala City, Guatemala. It was founded by Mariano Castillo Córdova and his brother, Rafael Castillo Córdova.

Products

Gallo
Gallo is a 5% abv pale lager. It is Guatemala's oldest continually produced beer, dating back to 1896. It is also the most famous beer in the country, and has become part of Guatemalan popular culture.

It is sold in  aluminum cans,  returnable bottles, 355 mL non-returnable bottles, and  returnable bottles. In recent years Gallo has been exported to other Central American countries, Mexico, France and the United States. It is sold under the name Famosa ("Famous") in the latter two. The label's design features a cockerel.

Gallo has received several international certifications, including the gold medal certification "Monde Selection" from Belgium, in recognition for its outstanding quality. The brewery also claims to have received the "Prestige Award" and also claims to be the only two breweries in the Americas to have received it.

Gallo Light 
Gallo Light is a light beer, the first and only one in the Guatemalan market, with low calories and a 4.2% alcohol content.

Victoria 
Victoria is a pale lager with a 5% alcohol content by volume.

Victoria was launched, in a  canned format, in the western part of Guatemala in 1996. It proved successful, and expansion into the rest of the nation's territory began shortly afterwards.

Other products 

Chopp Gallo, Cabro, Dorada Ice, Dorada Draft, Monte Carlo, Moza, Malta

References

External links 
 Official web site
 Redict Site
 Cervecería Centroamericana, S.A.
 Cerveza Gallo (Facebook)
 Cerveza Dorada Ice (Facebook)
 Conéctate Con tu Chela (Facebook)

Beer in Central America
Food and drink companies of Guatemala